The 2021 World Pool Championship was a pool tournament that took place between June 6 to 10, 2021 in the Marshall Arena in Milton Keynes, England. Following the 2021 Championship League Pool and the 2021 World Cup of Pool it was the third event of the season to be held in Milton Keynes.

The reigning champion was Russian player Fedor Gorst, who defeated Chang Jung-Lin 13–11 in the 2019 final. This year, he lost in the round of 64 to Skyler Woodward 8–11.

Format
The event was entered by 128 participants who were initially divided into 16 groups of 8 players, in which they competed against each other from June 6 to 7 in a double elimination tournament. Four players in each group qualified for the final round, which was played from June 8 to 10. The event was played under "winners break" format.

The early rounds were held behind closed doors, but fans were allowed for the final day.

Prize money 
The event saw a total prize pool of $250,000, an increase of $100,000 from the previous edition. The winner's share was increased from $30,000 to $50,000.

Results 
The draw was made during the 2021 World Pool Masters. The results are shown below, with bold denoting match winners.

Group A

Group B

Group C

Group D

Group E

Group F

Group G

Group H

Group I

Group J

Group K

Group L

Group M

Group N

Group O

Group P

Finals

Grand Final
The final was played between Austrian Albin Ouschan and Kuwaiti Omar Al-Shaheen, with the winner breaks format. Albin Ouschan won the match 13–9 and won the 9-ball world championship for the second time.

Broadcasting
All groups of the tournament were available worldwide via the following broadcasters:

References

External links
  at azbilliards.com
  at matchroompool.com

2021
WPA World Nine-ball Championship
2021 in English sport
World Nine-ball
Sport in Milton Keynes